Apex was a Polish heavy metal, hard rock and progressive rock band. It was started in 1980, in Prudnik.

History 
The band was formed in 1980 in Prudnik. It performed mostly hard rock songs and ballads. It was considered to be one of the best rock bands in Opole Voivodeship. In 1986 the band won the Polskie Radio Program III eliminations to the "Śpiewajmy Poezję" contest in Olsztyn. In 1987 the band performed at the Drrrama festival in Pruszcz Gdański. It was dissolved in 1988.

Personnel

Final lineup 
 Grzegorz Panek – vocals (1986–1988)
 Mariusz Lewicz – guitar (1980–1988)
 Ireneusz Raczyk – guitar (1986–1988)
 Zbigniew Towarnicki – bass guitar (1980–1988)
 Krzysztof Robotycki – drums (1986–1988)

Former members 
 Józef Kotyś – vocals (1980–1986)
 Norbert Mletzko – guitar (1980–1986)
 Zbigniew Ociepka – drums (1980–1986)

Timeline

References 

Polish heavy metal musical groups
Polish progressive metal musical groups
Polish progressive rock groups
Polish hard rock musical groups
Musical groups established in 1980